was a village located in Tone District, northern Gunma Prefecture.

Geography
Mountain Range：
River：

History
April 1, 1889 Due to the municipal status enforcement, the villages of 新巻, 相俣, and 羽場 merged to form the village of Yunohara.
May 1, 1908 Merged with the village of Kuga, Tone District, to form the village of village of Niiharu.
October 1, 2005 Village of Niiharu merged with the towns of Tsukiyono and (former) Minakami to become the town of Minakami.

Dissolved municipalities of Gunma Prefecture